Oletha A. Goudeau (August 5, 1959) is a Democratic member of the Kansas Senate, representing the 29th district (central/northeast Wichita) since 2009—the first African-American woman in the Kansas Senate. Most recently, she is the Senate Assistant Minority Leader.

She was previously a Kansas Representative, serving from her appointment in 2004 until 2009.

She is a community activist from Wichita.

Early life and education
Born August 5, 1959 in Wichita, Kansas, Faust-Goudeau is one of five children of Oretha Faust, a prominent inner-city Wichita community activist and politician.

Faust-Goudeau studied pre-law at Wichita State University, and became a photographer and community activist.

Kansas House of Representatives
In 2002, she ran for the seat of retiring Kansas State Representative Jonathan Wells, representing the 84th District (inner-city Wichita) - but was defeated by fellow Democrat Donald Betts. However, in 2003, Betts was appointed to fill a state senate vacancy, and by a vote of precinct committeemen and committeewomen, Faust-Goudeau was appointed to fill Betts' vacant seat in the Kansas House of Representatives. In 2004, she was elected to the seat, becoming the first African-American woman elected to represent the district. In 2006, she was re-elected to the seat.

Kansas Senate
In 2008, Faust-Goudeau was elected to the Kansas Senate, representing the 29th District (Wichita) -- becoming, upon inauguration in 2009, the first African-American woman in the state senate's history, and one of the only two African-Americans in the Kansas Senate (as of January 2016). She is currently Senate Assistant Minority Leader.

She was re-elected by wide margins in 2012, 2016 (unopposed), and 2020.

Her 29th Senate district—predominantly inner-city central/north-central and northeast Wichita—includes most of the minority neighborhoods—and the city's poorest people, along with its richest.

Committee assignments
Faust-Goudeau serves on these legislative committees:

 Ethics and Elections
 Federal and State Affairs
 Joint Committee on Arts and Cultural Resources
 Joint Committee on Children's Issues
 Commerce
 Joint Committee on Economic Development
 Local Government

Major donors
Some of the top contributors to Faust-Goudeau's 2008 campaign, according to OpenSecrets:

 Kansas National Education Association
 Kansans for Lifesaving Cures
 KTLA Consumer Civil Justice
 Kansas Contractors Association
 AT&T Labor interests

Positions
Faust-Goudeau characterizes herself as a "Republicrat," representing her district's voters regardless of party. Senate Minority Leader Anthony Hensley has characterized her as "the strongest pro-family legislator in the Legislature," building her career chiefly on helping families and children.

Faust-Goudeau's chief activity has been in protecting rights and services for seniors, the disabled, and children—including children in state custody—and in promoting business/development interests. Some legislation which Faust-Goudeau introduced, which became law:

 "Grandparents' rights" bills, three of which she introduced, became law in 2006-2012—latest became law in 2012 with unanimous Legislative backing—essentially forcing the State and the courts to consider grandparents' for possible custody requests in most child-custody cases in which the State has intervened (e.g.: foster care cases). Prior laws she introduced required grandparents to be heard in foster-care cases, and—if caring for their grandchildren as foster parents—to be reimbursed by the state the same as foster parents.
 Firefighters' insurance bill — became law in 2012 with unanimous Legislative backing—ensuring that the families of firefighters killed in action are able to continue receiving protection under their firefighter's insurance coverage for the first 18 months following their firefighter's death in the line of duty.
 Drug paraphernalia prohibition bill — outlawing the distribution of certain kinds of drug paraphernalia, became law.
 Poor/working-class issues - Representing the inner-city area of Wichita (the state's largest city), Faust-Goudeau frequently takes the lead in speaking out on, and advocating for, the needs and interests of poor and working-class Kansans. Examples include:
 Opposing welfare restrictions. When the newly-libertarian Kansas Legislature in 2015 began a series of "attacks on the poor," these included bills introduced with exceptionally detailed lists of restrictions on welfare recipients, forbidding a wide range of purchases with welfare money, and limiting welfare cash disbursements to $30 per day, severely complicating bill-payment and other financial management issues for welfare recipients -- unusual restrictions which drew international attention. Faust-Goudeau was the most frequently cited opponent of the proposed restrictions.
 Food sales tax elimination bill. With the increasingly-libertarian Kansas Legislature in 2014-2015 opposing taxes at every turn, Faust-Goudeau joined with new Republican/libertarian legislator Michael O'Donnell to propose the elimination of sales taxes on food (widely decried as a "regressive" tax disproportionately affecting the poor and working class families, and outlawed in several other states). Specifically, their Senate Bill 263 would have eliminated the state tax on fruits and vegetables. At the time of the bill, the Kansas sales tax on groceries was among the highest in the nation (second only to Mississippi), further aggravated by Kansas localities often adding additional taxes to groceries. However, during a growing state funding crisis brought on by Republicans' previous tax-cutting measures, the grocery tax-relief bill faced little support from the Republican/Libertarian-controlled legislature and Governor. But, at the close of the 2015 Legislative Session, a variation of Faust-Goudeau's plan passed the Kansas Senate, and (at this writing, June 8, 2015) awaits House approval.

Sedgwick County Commission candidacy
In 2010, Faust-Goudeau was the Democratic Party nominee for County Commissioner for the Sedgwick County 1st District. She was defeated by Republican Richard Ranzau.

Awards and recognition
 2008: "10 to Watch in 2010"—list of 10 noteworthy leaders cited by the state's largest newspaper, the Wichita Eagle
 2008: Service Award (for work as Co-Chair of the Sedgwick County legislative delegation), Sedgwick County, Kansas
 2011: "Legislator of the Year Award, 2011," by the "Silver-Haired Legislature", a Kansas senior-citizens' lobbying organization
 2017: Distinguished Service to Children Award, Kansas Children's Service League
 2017: Outstanding Ally in Government Award, Voices for Choice
 2017: Wichita - Butterfly Award, Katherine Johnson Scholar Sisters Elementary STEM Club
 2021 Legislator of the Year Award, Kansas Interfaith Action
 "Perfect Attendance" record—appearing for all Senate votes, in 2010, 2011 and various successive years

Memberships
Current and former board memberships:

 Wichita Habitat for Humanity executive board
 Legal Services of Wichita executive board
 League of Women Voters
 KPTS-TV (public TV station) Community Advisory Board
 NAACP Wichita Branch
 City of Wichita Human Services Board

See also
 Kansas's 29th Senate district

References

External links
Oletha Faust-Goudeau:
 Website: http://oletha.org
 Twitter:  https://twitter.com/oletha29
 Facebook: https://www.facebook.com/oletha.faustgoudeau.7
...and on Kansas Democratic Party sites:
 KDP website
 Kansas Senate Democrats on Facebook
...and elsewhere:
  Vote Smart
Kansas Senate
Project Vote Smart profile
 Follow the Money campaign contributions
 2004, 2006, 2008

 Kansas African American Affairs Commission - "Legislators, Senator Faust Goudeau" 

Democratic Party Kansas state senators
Democratic Party members of the Kansas House of Representatives
Living people
Women state legislators in Kansas
African-American state legislators in Kansas
African-American women in politics
1959 births
21st-century American politicians
21st-century American women politicians
21st-century African-American women
21st-century African-American politicians
20th-century African-American people
20th-century African-American women